Loha Pahalwan is a 2018 Indian Bhojpuri-language action drama film directed by Iqbal Baksh and produced by Sanjay A Nishad and Ramesh Vyas with co-produced by Sushil Singh under banner of "Lakshmi Ganpathy Films" and "Nishad Productions". The film features Pawan Singh and Payas Pandit in the lead role while Sushil Singh, Prakash Jais, Dev Singh, Pushpak Chawla, Deepak Sinha, Santosh Pahalwan, Dhama Verma, Shraddha Naval, Heera Yadav also play pivotal roles. Seema Singh and Glori Mohanta make a special appearance in songs.

Cast
Pawan Singh as Loha Singh
Payas Pandit as Suman
Sushil Singh as Pahalwan
Prakash Jais as 97-98
Dev Singh as Vikky (Pahalwan's Elder Son) 
Pushpak Chawla as Munna (Pahalwan's Younger Son) 
Deepak Sinha as Constable Rampal
 Dhama Verma as Constable
 Santosh Pahalwan as Jageshwar (Pahalwan's henchman)
 Shraddha Naval as Loha's Mother
 Jafar Khan as Loha's Father
Heera Yadav as A Villan
Glori Mohanta as Special appearance in song "Nanado Mal De Na"
Seema Singh as Special appearance in song "Aai Maai Haradi"

Production
Filming for this film was done in Film City, Tulsi Vihar (Madh), Subham Banglow and Chandiwali in Mumbai. The film was got U/A certificate by Censor Board of India without any cut.

The cinematography has been done by K Venkat Mahesh while choreography is by Rikki Gupta and Ram Devan. Art direction done by Manish Shirke. It was edited by Kunal Prabhu while action direction by Heera Yadav. VFX done by "Fiction Animation Studio". Editing and post-production done by "Ganraj Associates".

Release
The film's theatrically release scheduled on 14 September 2018; but due to some issue, film was released on 21 September 2018 on all theatres of Bihar, Jharkhand, Mumbai and Gujarat and received a massive opening and has been running housefull in theatres. On 2 October 2018, film released in the all theatre of Uttar Pradesh and Delhi.

Soundtrack

The soundtrack for "Loha Pahalwan" was composed by Chhote Baba with lyrics penned by Azad Singh, Manoj Matlabi, Sujit Singh Chandrawanshi and Munna Dubey. The soundtrack included large number of songs at 6. It was produced under the "Worldwide Records Bhojpuri" label, who also bought his satellite rights. Full album recorded by Pawan Singh, Indu Sonali, Alka Jha, Priyanka Singh and Mamta Rawat.

Marketing
The trailer was this film was released on 12 March 2018 on the official YouTube channel of "Worldwide Records Bhojpuri" which crossed over 6 millions views on YouTube.

The film online stream at Online video platform site YouTube on 23 November 2019 on same sub-handle of trailer released and it got 10 millions views on YouTube till now.

References

Indian action drama films
2010s Bhojpuri-language films
2018 action drama films